The Axis of Perdition is an English industrial black metal band from Middlesbrough, England. They are signed to Code666 Records.

The band rose from the ashes of Minethorn and consisted of Tetsuo Unit BRJ (a.k.a. Brooke Johnson, vocals, guitars, bass and programming) and Test Subject MGB (a.k.a. Michael Blenkarn, guitars, keyboards and programming).

Music
The Axis of Perdition's output comprises black metal experimentation with industrial music and dark ambient textures. The Axis of Perdition's debut album stated that "Axis of Perdition plays something there isn't words for yet (exclusively)".

Their sound is primarily based on distorted guitars with black metal vocals, programmed drums, and discordant sound effects including screams and static. The black metal aspects of the music are digitally distorted, interspersed with atmospheric soundscapes formed by synthesizers and field recordings. The Axis of Perdition's tracks tend to feature shifting free-form arrangements that lack a typical verse-chorus structure and tend toward lengthiness (one such track, from Deleted Scenes from the Transition Hospital, is over twelve minutes long).

Tapping inspiration from H. P. Lovecraft, Ramsey Campbell and the Silent Hill games (their EP Physical Illucinations in the Sewer of Xuchilbara is named for the dark deity of the games) as well themes of urban decay and mental illness, The Axis of Perdition are often compared to groups like Anaal Nathrakh and Blut Aus Nord for their similar grim, urban industrial metal aesthetics.

In 2013, the group separated due to a mutual agreement between Blenkarn and Johnson, but reunited in 2019 under the name An Axis of Perdition.

Line-up
 Brooke Johnson – Vocals, Jazz Guitar, Ambience. (also member of the bands Mine(thorn), Halo of the Sun, Pulsefear, Hesper Payne, Nord, Irradiant and Monument)
 Michael Blenkarn – Lead & Rhythm Guitar, Keyboard & Piano, Programming, Ambience. (also member of the bands Wodensthrone and Phaleg)
 Ian Fenwick – Bass Guitar. (also member of the band Mine(thorn) and Hesper Payne)
 Dan Mullins – Live Drums & Percussion. (Also a member of The Raven Theory ex-Bal-Sagoth, and My Dying Bride, amongst others)
 Leslie Simpson – Flotsam. (also actor: Films: Dog Soldiers, The Descent, Doomsday and Stage: director/actor threeovereden

Discography
 Corridors (Split with Pulsefear, 2002)
 The Ichneumon Method (And Less Welcome Techniques) (album, 2003)
 Physical Illucinations in the Sewer of Xuchilbara (The Red God) (EP, 2004)
 Deleted Scenes from the Transition Hospital (album, 2005)
 Urfe (album, 2008)
 Tenements (of the Anointed Flesh)  (album, 2011)

References

External links
 Official site of The Axis

British industrial metal musical groups
English black metal musical groups
Musical groups established in 2002
Musical quintets
2002 establishments in the United Kingdom